Merrimack may refer to:

 Merrimack, New Hampshire, a town
 Merrimack County, New Hampshire
 Merrimack River, in Massachusetts and New Hampshire
 Merrimack Valley, the region surrounding the river
 Merrimac, California, also spelled Merrimack

Education
 Merrimack College, North Andover, Massachusetts
 Merrimack High School, Merrimack, New Hampshire
 Merrimack Valley High School, Penacook, New Hampshire

Other uses
 Merrimack Pharmaceuticals, a pharmaceutical company based in Massachusetts
 USS Merrimack, several ships

See also
 Merrimac (disambiguation)
 Meramec (disambiguation)
 Maramec

fr:Merrimac